Julien Vervaecke (3 November 1899 – May 1940) was a Belgian professional road bicycle racer. He won Paris–Roubaix, Paris–Brussels, 2 stages in the Tour de France and finished 3rd in the 1927 Tour de France.
At the start of the Second World War Battle of Belgium, when a British army detachment wanted to take his house, he refused, and was shot. His body was found weeks later, so the exact date of his death is not known.

Julien's younger brother, Félicien Vervaecke, was also a successful cyclist.

Major results

1927
Tour de France:
Winner stage 16
3rd place overall classification
1928
GP Wolber
Omloop van België
Tour de France:
5th place overall classification
1929
Tour de France:
Winner stage 15
8th place overall classification
1930
Paris–Roubaix
Tour de France:
6th place overall classification
1932
Paris–Brussels
1933
Berchem
Paris–Roubaix
2nd place overall

References

External links 

 Official Tour de France results for Julien Vervaecke
 
 

Belgian male cyclists
1899 births
1940 deaths
Belgian Tour de France stage winners
Cyclists from West Flanders
People from Moorslede
Belgian civilians killed in World War II
People executed by the British military by firing squad
Deaths by firearm in France